Gardenia hutchinsoniana is a species of plant in the family Rubiaceae. It is endemic to Fiji.

References

Endemic flora of Fiji
hutchinsoniana
Least concern plants
Taxonomy articles created by Polbot